Mahbub Ahmed Sadek (known as Sadek Bachchu; 1 January 1955 – 14 September 2020) was a Bangladeshi film actor. He also appeared in television dramas and theatre. He won Bangladesh National Film Award for Best Actor in Negative Role for the film Ekti Cinemar Golpo (2018).

Early life and background
Bachchu was born, as Mahbub Ahmed Sadek, on 1 January 1955 in Haziganj, Chandpur in the then East Bengal. He made his acting career debut with Shahidul Amin directed Ramer Sumati.

Work
Films

Death
Bachchu died in a hospital on 14 September 2020, aged 65, after being diagnosed with COVID-19 during the COVID-19 pandemic in Bangladesh.

References

External links
 

1955 births
2020 deaths
Bangladeshi male film actors
Best Performance in a Negative Role National Film Award (Bangladesh) winners
Deaths from the COVID-19 pandemic in Bangladesh